This is a list of Eurasian countries and dependent territories by population, which is sorted by the 2015 mid-year normalized demographic projections.

Table

See also
 List of Asian countries by population
 List of countries by population (United Nations)
 List of European countries by population
 List of African countries by population
 List of Oceanian countries by population

Notes

Population
Population
Eurasia Population
Population
Population
Lists of countries by continent
Lists of countries by population
Lists of countries by continent, by population
Population